The Hanseatic Trade Center (HTC) is a major office complex in the HafenCity of Hamburg, Germany. Developed after an urban design competition in the 1980s, and built in five phases during the 1990s, it was the first new construction in the urban renewal of this part of the Port of Hamburg. Parts of the  Hanseatic Trade Center along Kehrwiederfleet complement the historic Speicherstadt, while its western end at Kehrwiederspitze features two high-rise structures.

Overview 

It is located on the western tip of HafenCity, surrounded by water on three sides. To the north, Binnenhafen separates it from Hamburg's Altstadt (old town), to the south it is facing Sandtorhafen and HafenCity proper. Public transport is available at Baumwall station, just across Niederbaumbrücke.

During construction and the first years after, the five buildings were named by order of development phase. When Tishman Speyer Properties and Quantum Immobilien AG acquired four of the five buildings in 2005, the buildings were subsequently marketed by names of famous explorers and seafarers:

 Phase I: Vespucci-Haus (1993) by Kohn Pedersen Fox 
 Phase II: Columbus-Haus (2002) by Nägele, Hofmann & Tiedemann 
 Phase III: Humboldt-Haus (1992) by Dieter Heusch
 Phase IV: Amundsen-Haus (1999) by Gerkan, Marg & Partner
 Phase V: Kehrwiederspitze (1997) by Kleffel, Köhnholdt & Gundermann

Kehrwiederspitze was the only building not sold in 2005. The entire complex lies within the flood-exposed area of the Lower Elbe. Therefore, all five buildings are connected by a network of upper floor boardwalks among each other and to the inner-city.

See also  
 
 List of tallest buildings in Hamburg
 List of tallest buildings in Germany
 List of world trade centers

References

External links 

  
 

Buildings and structures in Hamburg-Mitte
Office buildings completed in 1997
World Trade Centers
Urban planning in Germany
Gerkan, Marg and Partners buildings
Kohn Pedersen Fox buildings
Skyscraper office buildings in Germany